Rozwell Kid is an American indie rock band formed in 2011 in West Virginia, United States. They released their first studio album on Broken World Media and their most recent album on SideOneDummy.

History
Rozwell Kid began in 2011 with the release of an album titled The Rozwell Kid LP.

In February 2013, Rozwell Kid released their second album titled Unmacho. In October 2013, Rozwell Kid released a split with Sleeping Bag titled Dreamboats.

In November 2014, Rozwell Kid released their third LP titled Too Shabby, which featured guitar solos approved by Lee Hartney of The Smith Street Band.

In March 2015, Rozwell Kid released an EP titled Good Graphics. On June 23, 2015, Rozwell Kid released a split with The World Is a Beautiful Place & I Am No Longer Afraid to Die titled Fourteen Minute Mile.

In June 2017, Rozwell Kid released an album titled Precious Art, their first album on SideOneDummy. The album received positive reviews from numerous publications, with an average review score of 80 on Metacritic based on seven reviews. The album went on to reach the 13th position on the Billboard Heatseekers Albums chart, as well as 24th on the Vinyl Albums chart and 39th on the Independent Albums chart.

Band members
Jordan Hudkins - Vocals/Guitar
Adam L. Meisterhans - Guitar
Devin Donnelly - Bass/Vocals
Sean Hallock - Drums/Percussion
Derrick Brandon - Guitar (touring)
Ben Gauthier - Guitar (touring)

Discography

Studio albums
The Rozwell Kid LP (2011, Broken World Media)
Unmacho (2013, Broken World Media)
Too Shabby (2014, Broken World Media)
Precious Art (2017, SideOneDummy Records)

EPs and splits
Rozwell Kid/Sleeping Bag - Dreamboats (2013, Jurassic Pop)
The World Is a Beautiful Place & I Am No Longer Afraid to Die/Rozwell Kid/Kittyhawk/Two Knights - Sundae Bloody Sundae (2014, Skeletal Lightning)
Rozwell Kid/The World Is a Beautiful Place & I Am No Longer Afraid To Die - Fourteen Minute Mile (2015, Broken World Media)
Good Graphics (2015, Infinity Cat Recordings)
Rozwell Kid/Sleeping Bag - Dreamboats 2: A Real Chill Sequel (2020, self-released)

References

Musical groups from West Virginia
Musical groups established in 2011
American power pop groups
Indie rock musical groups from West Virginia
SideOneDummy Records artists
2011 establishments in West Virginia